Red Smith may refer to:

 Red Smith (third baseman) (1890–1966), 1910s baseball third baseman
 Red Smith (catcher) (1892–1970), Pittsburgh Pirates catcher, 1917–1918
 Red Smith (shortstop) (1899–1961), MLB shortstop in the 1925 season
 Red Smith (Negro leagues), Negro league baseball player
 Red Smith (American football/baseball) (1904–1978), New York Giants catcher in the 1927 season, Green Bay Packers coach
 Red Smith (American football), Cumberland Bulldogs football center in the early 1900s
 Red Smith (sportswriter) (1905–1982), sportswriter
 Red Smith (coach) (1906–1959), American football, baseball, and track coach

See also
 Red Smith Award, an annual journalism award, given by the Associated Press Sports Editors (APSE) 
 Red Smith Stakes, an annual Thoroughbred horse race, previously known as the Red Smith Handicap